Fall River Water Aerodrome  is located  south of Fall River, Nova Scotia, Canada.

References

Registered aerodromes in Nova Scotia
Transport in Halifax, Nova Scotia
Seaplane bases in Nova Scotia